This is a list of Superfund sites in Texas designated under the Comprehensive Environmental Response, Compensation, and Liability Act (CERCLA) environmental law.  The CERCLA federal law of 1980 authorized the United States Environmental Protection Agency (EPA) to create a list of polluted locations requiring a long-term response to clean up hazardous material contaminations.   These locations are known as Superfund sites, and are placed on the National Priorities List (NPL).  

The NPL guides the EPA in "determining which sites warrant further investigation" for environmental remediation. As of September 6, 2017, there are 53 Superfund sites on the National Priorities List in Texas.  One new site has been proposed for inclusion on the list. Twelve additional sites have been cleaned up and are considered deleted, with no further action required.  One NPL site included in this list, Motco, Inc., has been designated as the state's Top Priority Site. According to CERCLA, states may make only one such designation and is one that the State has identified as presenting the greatest danger to public health, welfare, or the environment among the known facilities in that State.

Superfund sites

See also
List of Superfund sites in the United States
List of environmental issues
List of waste types
TOXMAP

References

External links
EPA list of proposed Superfund sites in Texas
EPA list of current Superfund sites in Texas
EPA list of Superfund site construction completions in Texas
EPA list of partially deleted Superfund sites in Texas
EPA list of deleted Superfund sites in Texas

Texas

Superfund